San Francisco, within Old San Juan, is one of the 7 subbarrios of San Juan Antiguo barrio in the municipality of San Juan in Puerto Rico. A historic church, the Church of Saint Francis of Assisi, is located in San Francisco.

History
Puerto Rico was ceded by Spain in the aftermath of the Spanish–American War under the terms of the Treaty of Paris of 1898 and became an unincorporated territory of the United States. In 1899, the United States Department of War conducted a census of Puerto Rico finding that the population of San Francisco was 1,177. In 2010, the population of San Francisco was 796.

Saint Francis of Assisi Church
 (Church of Saint Francis of Assisi) is located on San Francisco Street. This historic church gives its name to the subdistrict. Some famous Puerto Rican figures such as Impressionist painter Francisco Oller have been buried in its crypt.

Gallery

See also

 List of communities in Puerto Rico

References

External links
 

Old San Juan, Puerto Rico
Geography of San Juan, Puerto Rico